Kiryl Pyachenin (born 18 March 1997) is a Belarusian professional footballer, who plays as a left midfielder or left-back for Russian club Orenburg.

Honours
Dinamo Brest
Belarusian Super Cup winner: 2020

Career statistics

References

External links 
 
 

1997 births
Sportspeople from Vitebsk
Living people
Belarusian footballers
Belarus under-21 international footballers
Belarus international footballers
Association football defenders
FC Vitebsk players
FC Orsha players
FC Naftan Novopolotsk players
FC Dynamo Brest players
FC Rukh Brest players
FC Orenburg players
Belarusian First League players
Belarusian Premier League players
Russian First League players
Russian Premier League players
Belarusian expatriate footballers
Expatriate footballers in Russia
Belarusian expatriate sportspeople in Russia